A by-election was held in the House of Commons constituency of Epping Forest on 15 December 1988, following the death of Conservative Member of Parliament (MP) Sir John Biggs-Davison. The result was a hold for the Conservative Party.

Candidates
Steven Norris was the Conservative candidate. Norris had been elected to serve as MP for Oxford East at the 1983 general election but had lost the seat in 1987. His opponent from the Labour Party was Stephen Murray. Andrew Thompson was chosen as the candidate for the recently formed Social and Liberal Democrats. Thompson had been a founder member of the Social Democratic Party (SDP) and had served as a councillor in the local area since 1984. His main campaign issues were saving a local hospital from closure and defending the green belt status of Epping Forest.

The rump SDP which had rejected the merger with the Liberal Party also put forward a candidate, Michael Pettman. Pettman, a solicitor and local councillor, and Oxford University (Magdalen College) graduate, had been the candidate for the SDP in Epping Forest at the previous general election. Michael had a son born 1982 and a daughter born in 1986 and was married to Gillian. He was originally from Kent. Both the Green Party, represented by Andrew Simms and the Official Monster Raving Loony Party, represented by party leader and serial election candidate David Sutch, contested the election as well. Sutch stood under the name "Monster Raving Loony - Liberal Birthday Party" in this election.

Tina Wingfield stood under the designation of "Independent National Front" although at the time she was actually a member of the National Council of the Flag Group, a breakaway party from the NF. Other candidates were Jackie Moore for the Rainbow Alliance (who added the name Change the World to her party designation) and Brian Goodier, who stood as the "Vote no Belsen for South Africans" candidate.

Results

Candidate Brian Goodier misspelt Belson on his nomination paper.

See also
 Lists of United Kingdom by-elections

References

Epping Forest by-election
Epping Forest by-election
Epping Forest by-election
Epping Forest District
By-elections to the Parliament of the United Kingdom in Essex constituencies
1980s in Essex